Figurative may refer to:

 Figurative analogy, a comparison between things that are not alike but do share some common property
 Figurative art, representational artwork
 Literal and figurative language, a distinction within language analysis
 Neo-figurative art, an expressionist revival art movement